Life After Death Row is a documentary on the musical career of the rapper Crooked I. The tell-all film was released on August 29th, 2006 and illustrates the trials and tribulations Crooked I endured while under contract under the infamous Death Row Records. 

The film also takes the viewer on a journey with Crooked I building his own record label Dynasty Entertainment. The film contains many guest appearances from other musical figures who share similar views of Crooked I. These individuals include Russell Simmons, Master P, Jim Gittum, Loon, Bun B, WC, RBX, Big C Style, Mopreme Shakur, Phobia, Eastwood, Spider Loc, Paperboy.

References

External links
 Treacherous Records
 Life After Death Row Trailer

Documentary films about singers